The Jingmei River is a major tributary of the Xindian River, which itself is a major tributary of the Tamsui River, Taiwan. It is located between the Taipei Basin and Beishi River basin and flows through New Taipei City and the capital Taipei City for 28.1 kilometers, before joining the Xindian River at the border of Wenshan District, Taipei, and Yonghe District, New Taipei City, above the Fuhe Bridge.

See also
List of rivers in Taiwan

References

Rivers of Taiwan
Landforms of New Taipei
Landforms of Taipei